Estacada  is a city in Clackamas County, Oregon, United States, about  southeast of Portland. The 2020 population is estimated to be 3,700. According to the 2010 census, the population in 2010 was 2,695.

History

The Estacada post office opened on February 24, 1904 and the city was incorporated in May 1905. The community formed as a camp for workers building a hydroelectric dam on the nearby Clackamas River that was to supply Portland with electricity. At the time, the river was relatively inaccessible by road, forcing the Oregon Power Railway Company to build a railway to the vicinity of the river to transport crews to the river for the construction of the dam. After the construction of the Hotel Estacada, the town became a weekend destination on the railroad line for residents of Portland. During the week, the train carried freight and work crews to and from Portland. Following the development of the dams, the city became a hub for the logging industry. In the early 20th century, a trolley line connected the town with downtown Portland. The railway line has been removed and there is no longer rail service to Estacada.

Name
The origin of the city's name is disputed. One explanation is that the city's name is a corruption of the names of a civic leader's daughters, Esther and Katie, however, there is no evidence of their existence. Another theory states that: Estacado is a Spanish word and it means "staked out" or "marked with stakes". It was first suggested by George Kelly as a name for the town site at a meeting of the Oregon Water Power Townsite Company directors on December 27, 1903. Kelly had selected the name at random from a U.S. map showing Llano Estacado in Texas. If Kelly's suggestion had not been drawn from the hat, the town could have been named Rochester, Lowell or Lynn. The name Estacada is also used in Arizona.

Geography

Outside the city limits the land is mainly farmland, extending from the Springwater area to the south, Eagle Creek to the west, and the Mount Hood National Forest to the north and east.

Climate
Estacada has a warm-summer Mediterranean climate (Köppen Csb).

Demographics

2010 census
As of the census of 2010, there were 2,695 people, 1,062 households, and 672 families residing in the city. The racial makeup of the city was 92.0% White, 0.8% African American, 0.7% Native American, 1.2% Asian, 0.2% Pacific Islander, 2.7% from other races, and 2.4% from two or more races. Hispanic or Latino of any race were 7.5% of the population.

There were 1,062 households, of which 35.1% had children under the age of 18 living with them, 43.8% were married couples living together, 14.0% had a female householder with no husband present, 5.5% had a male householder with no wife present, and 36.7% were non-families. 30.4% of all households were made up of individuals, and 15.1% had someone living alone who was 65 years of age or older. The average household size was 2.53 and the average family size was 3.16.

The median age in the city was 35.7 years. 26.8% of residents were under the age of 18; 8.3% were between the ages of 18 and 24; 27.2% were from 25 to 44; 24.6% were from 45 to 64; and 12.9% were 65 years of age or older. The gender makeup of the city was 49.8% male and 50.2% female.

2000 census
As of the census of 2000, there were 2,371 people, 850 households, and 591 families residing in the city. The population density was 2,259.6 people per square mile (871.9/km2). There were 886 housing units at an average density of 844.4 per square mile (325.8/km2). The racial makeup of the city was 84.86% White, 0.17% African American, 1.43% Native American, 1.77% Asian, 0.04% Pacific Islander, 9.91% from other races, and 1.81% from two or more races. Hispanic or Latino of any race were 12.78% of the population.

There were 850 households, out of which 39.9% had children under the age of 18 living with them, 50.9% were married couples living together, 13.1% had a female householder with no husband present, and 30.4% were non-families. 26.2% of all households were made up of individuals, and 13.9% had someone living alone who was 65 years of age or older. The average household size was 2.78 and the average family size was 3.26.

In the city, the population was spread out, with 29.6% under the age of 18, 10.5% from 18 to 24, 28.5% from 25 to 44, 20.5% from 45 to 64, and 11.1% who were 65 years of age or older. The median age was 33 years. For every 100 females, there were 93.2 males. For every 100 females age 18 and over, there were 90.9 males.

The median income for a household in the city was $39,200, and the median income for a family was $46,445. Males had a median income of $37,269 versus $22,267 for females. The per capita income for the city was $17,049. About 10.1% of families and 12.9% of the population were below the poverty line, including 15.8% of those under age 18 and 5.9% of those age 65 or over.

Economy
After the building of the dams, the primary base for Estacada's economy has been lumber. As the timber industry has declined, the economy of the city has been depressed in recent years. However, a thriving arts community has been building up over the years.

Arts and culture
The Estacada Public Library is part of the Library Information Network of Clackamas County.

Government
On June 22, 2020, Estacada mayor Sean Drinkwine became the subject of statewide controversy after making an inflammatory Facebook post about the George Floyd protests, in which he vowed to "shut those vigils down" following a peaceful protest of nearly 50 residents outside of Estacada City Hall.

Education
Estacada is served by the Estacada School District, which includes River Mill Elementary School, Clackamas River Elementary School, Estacada Middle School, and Estacada High School, which are all located within Estacada's city limits.

Media
The Estacada News is a weekly newspaper owned and operated by the Pamplin Media Group.

Infrastructure

Transportation

Air
Valley View Airport

Bus
TriMet's route 30 connects the city with Clackamas Town Center mall and the Clackamas Town Center Transit Center, which is a stop on the MAX Green Line light rail line. The route's terminus is at Estacada City Hall. Sandy Area Metro extends bus service from City Hall to Sandy on weekdays, with connections to Gresham, connecting with TriMet lines and MAX light rail there.

Notable people 
A notable figure from the town of Estacada is basketball wonder Connor Hambelton, widely known as The Pride of Estacada.

See also

References

Further reading
Oregon Geographic Names, Lewis A. McArthur,  Fifth Edition,  Western Imprints, The Press of the Oregon Historical Society 1982.

External links
City of Estacada (official website)
Entry for Estacada in the Oregon Blue Book

Estacada/Clackamas River Area Chamber of Commerce
Estacada history from pdxhistory.com

Cities in Oregon
Cities in Clackamas County, Oregon
Portland metropolitan area
1904 establishments in Oregon
Populated places established in 1904
Railway towns in Oregon